The Portland Sea Dogs are a Minor League Baseball team based in Portland, Maine, playing in the Eastern League. Established in 1994, the Sea Dogs are the Double-A affiliate of the Boston Red Sox.

The Sea Dogs became part of the Red Sox system for the 2003 season; previously they were affiliated with the Florida Marlins. The change in affiliation brought success in the 2005 and 2006 seasons as the Sea Dogs went to the Eastern League championship series both years. They won their first-ever title on September 17, 2006, defeating the Akron Aeros, 8–5, in a rematch of the series from the previous year. It was the first Double-A championship for a Red Sox farm team since 1983 when they were based in New Britain, Connecticut.

Currently, all games are carried on a network of radio stations with Emma Tiedemann providing the play-by-play, with the flagship WPEI and select TV games on NESN with Eric Frede play-by-play and former Red Sox relief pitcher Ken Ryan.

History
Minor league baseball officially returned to Maine on October 4, 1992, when Portland was awarded one of two Eastern League expansion franchises (the other being the New Haven Ravens) to begin play in April 1994. The Sea Dogs signed an affiliation agreement with the Florida Marlins on May 3, 1993, beginning what would become a nine-season relationship. The city renovated Hadlock Field, transforming what was once a high-school stadium into a professional ballpark. City manager Robert Ganley led efforts to renovate Hadlock Field and return professional baseball to Portland.

The team won its first game, defeating the Reading Phillies on the road 2–1, with the help of a 14th-inning home run by future major league catcher Charles Johnson. The team opened Hadlock Field on April 18, 1994, losing 7–6 to the Albany-Colonie Yankees.

Cartoonist Guy Gilchrist designed the team's logo as well as logos for the Connecticut Defenders, Binghamton Mets, and New Britain Rock Cats. Gilchrist's comic strip Mudpie had a series of strips in which the young cat's family visit the Portland area and attend a Sea Dogs game.

In conjunction with Major League Baseball's restructuring of Minor League Baseball in 2021, the Sea Dogs were organized into the Double-A Northeast. In 2022, the Double-A Northeast became known as the Eastern League, the name historically used by the regional circuit prior to the 2021 reorganization.

Stadium

The Sea Dogs' home stadium is Hadlock Field, named after long-time Portland High School baseball coach Edson Hadlock.  It currently has a seating capacity of 7,368. Hadlock Field is often visited by vacationing celebrities, such as former NFL coach Bill Parcells, former U.S. President George H. W. Bush, and his wife Barbara. In left field stands the Maine Monster, a -tall replica of Fenway Park's Green Monster, complete with Coke bottle and Citgo sign. Along the right-field foul line just beyond first base, a picnic pavilion is available for group outings from 20 up to 300 people. In 2006, a new pavilion opened above the right-field wall over the Sea Dogs bullpen. Modeled after the Green Monster seats at Fenway Park in Boston, it seats up to 393 people and gives fans an opportunity to catch a home run ball.

Slugger the Sea Dog has been the Sea Dogs' mascot since his debut on May 6, 1994.

Season records
The team was a member of the Northeast division of the Eastern League from 1994 to 2020 and the Northeast division of Double-A Northeast in 2021. They have been members of the Eastern League's Northeast division since 2022.

In the below table, "Place" represents finish within the team's division for the overall regular reason. Note that in 2019 and 2022, the Eastern League played a split-season schedule, with first-half and second-half winners advancing to the postseason.

Roster

Notes

References

External links

 
 Statistics from Baseball-Reference
 2021 Media Guide

 
Baseball teams established in 1994
Baseball in Portland, Maine
Eastern League (1938–present) teams
Professional baseball teams in Maine
Boston Red Sox minor league affiliates
Miami Marlins minor league affiliates
1994 establishments in Maine
Double-A Northeast teams